Laurel is a census-designated place (CDP) in Sarasota County, Florida, United States. The population was 8,171 at the 2010 census. 

Laurel is part of the North Port–Sarasota–Bradenton Metropolitan Statistical Area.

Geography

Demographics

As of the 2000 US Census, there were 8,393 people, 4,179 households, and 2,670 families residing in the CDP. The racial makeup of the CDP was 95.73% White, 1.97% African American, 0.30% Native American, 0.76% Asian, 0.01% Pacific Islander, 0.30% from other races, and 0.93% from two or more races. Hispanic or Latino of any race were 1.29% of the population.

There were 4,179 households, out of which 13.2% had children under the age of 18 living with them, 55.5% were married couples living together, 5.9% had a female householder with no husband present, and 36.1% were non-families. 30.4% of all households were made up of individuals, and 19.0% had someone living alone who was 65 years of age or older.  The average household size was 2.01 and the average family size was 2.44.

In the CDP, the population was spread out, with 12.4% under the age of 18, 3.1% from 18 to 24, 16.5% from 25 to 44, 28.8% from 45 to 64, and 39.3% who were 65 years of age or older.  The median age was 58 years. For every 100 females, there were 90.8 males.  For every 100 females age 18 and over, there were 88.2 males.

The median income for a household in the CDP was $42,186, and the median income for a family was $51,153. Males had a median income of $32,425 versus $27,905 for females. The per capita income for the CDP was $30,485.  About 5.2% of families and 8.4% of the population were below the poverty line, including 14.6% of those under age 18 and 6.3% of those age 65 or over.

Notable people 
 Vivian E. Browne, visual artist

References

Census-designated places in Sarasota County, Florida
Sarasota metropolitan area
Census-designated places in Florida
Populated places on the Intracoastal Waterway in Florida